Hypostomus angipinnatus is a species of catfish in the family Loricariidae. It is native to South America, where it occurs in the Río de La Plata drainage basin, as well as possibly the Paraguay River basin, although further investigation has found its presence in the Paraguay basin unlikely. The species reaches 15 cm (5.9 inches) in length and is believed to be a facultative air-breather.

References 

angipinnatus
Fish described in 1922